Matakaoa Ward is the most northern and eastern ward in the Gisborne District on the east coast of the North Island of New Zealand. It contains the towns Tikitiki, Te Araroa, and Hicks Bay. The ward also contains the East Cape Lighthouse, the most easterly place in mainland New Zealand.

References

Geography of the Gisborne District